Kenneth George Sanders (born July 8, 1941) is an American former professional baseball relief pitcher. He played in Major League Baseball (MLB) from 1964 to 1976 for the Kansas City Athletics, Boston Red Sox, Oakland Athletics, Milwaukee Brewers, Minnesota Twins, Cleveland Indians, California Angels, New York Mets, and Kansas City Royals.

Early years
Sanders attended St. Louis University High School in St. Louis, Missouri, and was a standout in soccer, football and baseball.

He went 19–10 with a 3.21 earned run average as a starting pitcher his first professional season with the Florida State League's Sanford Greyhounds. He split his time between starts and relief appearances until , when he was converted to a full-time reliever with the Birmingham Barons. He made his major league debut against the New York Yankees later that season, pitching 1.2 innings without giving up a run. For the season, Sanders went 0–2 with a 3.67 ERA and one save.

In , he went 3–6 with two saves and a 3.80 ERA for the Bosox before being dealt back to Kansas City with Jim Gosger and Guido Grilli for Rollie Sheldon, Jose Tartabull and John Wyatt. He made his only major league start upon his return to the A's, pitching four innings of one run ball against the California Angels before giving way to the bullpen.

Just prior to Spring training 1970, he, Mike Hershberger, Lew Krausse Jr. and Phil Roof were traded to the Milwaukee Brewers for Don Mincher and Ron Clark.

Milwaukee Brewers
The Brewers lost 97 games their first season in Milwaukee (after having spent one season in Seattle as the Pilots). One of the few bright spots on the team was Sanders' emergence as a legitimate major league closer. Sanders set a club record with 13 saves to go along with a 5–2 record and 1.75 ERA. His  season was even more impressive as he led Major League Baseball with 83 appearances on the mound (his closest competitor was Cincinnati Reds pitcher Wayne Granger with 70), and set a major league record by finishing 77 of them. He also led the major leagues with 31 saves. Coupled with his seven wins, Sanders figured in 38 of the Brewers' 69 wins.

He began the  season as the Brewers' closer, pitching 18.2 innings and earning four saves before giving up his first earned run of the season. From there, things went south for Sanders, as he found himself at 1–7 with a 3.45 ERA and 13 saves at the All-Star break. He lost the confidence of new Brewers manager Del Crandall, and only picked up four more saves for the rest of the season. Following the campaign, Sanders was traded twice in a span of 32 days. First, to the Philadelphia Phillies along with Jim Lonborg, Ken Brett and Earl Stephenson for Don Money, John Vukovich and Bill Champion on October 31. Then, to the Minnesota Twins along with Ken Reynolds and Joe Lis for César Tovar on December 1.

Journeyman
Sanders earned eight saves for the Twins by the end of May  despite a relatively high 5.60 ERA. He lost the closer's job to Ray Corbin, and was placed on waivers. He was soon claimed by the Cleveland Indians, and pitched far more respectably with his new club, going 5–1 with a 1.65 ERA and five saves.

He soon signed a minor league deal with the California Angels, and was promoted to the big league club after 19 games at triple A. He appeared in nine games with the Angels, earning one save. During the off season, he was traded to the New York Mets for catcher Ike Hampton.

Sanders, along with former Brewers teammate Skip Lockwood and Bob Apodaca, gave the Mets one of the more formidable bullpens in the division. For his part, Sanders went 1–1 with a 2.30 ERA and five saves. Toward the end of the  season, his contract was sold to the Kansas City Royals. He started the  season playing minor league ball for the Brewers before retiring, and moving into real estate.

Career stats

As a reliever, Sanders only had 67 plate appearances. One of his two career RBIs came against Hall of Famer Jim Palmer in 1966.

Personal life
He and his wife, Mary Ann, have three children, Leanne, Steven and Laura, and five grandchildren.

References

External links

Ken Sanders at Ultimate Mets Database
Ken Sanders at Pura Pelota (Venezuelan Professional Baseball League)

1941 births
Albuquerque Dukes players
American League saves champions
Baseball players from St. Louis
Binghamton Triplets players
Birmingham Barons players
Boston Red Sox players
California Angels players
Cardenales de Lara players
American expatriate baseball players in Venezuela
Cleveland Indians players
Industriales de Valencia players
Iowa Oaks players
Kansas City Athletics players
Kansas City Royals players
Living people
Major League Baseball pitchers
Milwaukee Brewers players
Minnesota Twins players
Nashville Vols players
New York Mets players
Oakland Athletics players
Portland Beavers players
Portsmouth-Norfolk Tides players
Salt Lake City Angels players
Sanford Greyhounds players
Spokane Indians players
Tidewater Tides players
Vancouver Mounties players